John Guleserian (born April 7, 1976) is an American cinematographer. He is best known for his collaboration with Drake Doremus on Like Crazy and Breathe In, and for the 2013 film About Time.

Early life
Guleserian aspired to be a filmmaker from a young age. He worked as an ice cream truck driver before studying cinematography at college, first as an undergraduate at Columbia College Chicago and then graduate school at the AFI Conservatory. While studying, he spent his spare time "shooting short films for any director that would let me" to gain experience.

Career
Guleserian began a longstanding collaboration with writer–director Drake Doremus at AFI, which both men attended at the same time. In 2006, Guleserian photographed Doremus's thesis project, and they paired up again to shoot numerous commercials and music videos in addition to the 2009 feature film Spooner. They later collaborated on Like Crazy, a romantic drama film that premiered at the 2011 Sundance Film Festival and won the festival's Grand Jury Prize, an achievement that Guleserian later said "opened up a lot of opportunities" for him. One such opportunity was the 2013 romantic comedy About Time, which was the first big-budget studio film Guleserian worked on; previously, he had only shot independent films with smaller budgets. The same year, he returned to work with Doremus as cinematographer on Breathe In, starring Felicity Jones and Guy Pearce. Since Doremus's films are largely improvised, Guleserian filmed these projects unconventionally, with mostly handheld camerawork in takes that usually last over ten minutes.

Guleserian's television credits include I Heart Vampires and Tim and Eric Awesome Show, Great Job!, and he was the director of photography on the 2014 films Parts per Billion, Song One and Before We Go. He shot the 2015 film Equals, a science fiction romance directed by Doremus and starring Kristen Stewart and Nicholas Hoult. He also filmed the 2015 sex comedy The Overnight, a project he became involved in because of his wife, a production designer hired to work on the film, who introduced Guleserian to the director, Patrick Brice.

In December 2014 he was named one of Complex magazine's "Underrated Cinematographers Poised to Make It Big in 2015". He has expressed an interest in working as a visual consultant on animated films.

Filmography
Film

Television

References

External links

1976 births
Living people
American cinematographers
American expatriates in the United Kingdom
AFI Conservatory alumni
Columbia College Chicago alumni